Rajeev Gandhi Memorial Boarding School is a self-funding, boarding senior high school located near Jaidu Mandi in Sheopur, Madhya Pradesh, India.

Organisation
Rajeev Gandhi Memorial is affiliated to the Central Board of Secondary Education. The school has a campus that consists of well-equipped laboratories, a library, classrooms and a playground.

History
This school was founded in 1999 by Dheerendra Singh Tomar. In the first year school was opened for only up to Class 9 and by the following years it went up to Class 12.  By 2000 the school received high school status. It is much hyped but in reality the institute falls way behind other schools. It admits students against CBSE guidelines. The facilities are not so good and the level of competition is less. Most students are from the nearby villages

The first principal of the school was Arvind Tomar. Raghvendra Dron was a later principal, and Shiv Nath Singh Sikarwar is the present principal.

Sports achievements
Students namely Vasid Khan, Tarun Shukla among others have competed in Cricket and Badminton at State level.

References

Sheopur
Private schools in Madhya Pradesh
Boarding schools in Madhya Pradesh
High schools and secondary schools in Madhya Pradesh
Educational institutions established in 2000
2000 establishments in Madhya Pradesh